Jai Kanhaiya Lal Ki [English:- Hail lord Kanhaiya Lal (lords Krishna)] is an Indian Hindi-language television mythological drama series that premiered on 19 October 2021 on Star Bharat. It is also digitally available on Disney+ Hotstar. A prequel of RadhaKrishn, the show stars Hazel Gaur, Sumedh Mudgalkar, Mallika Singh, Arpit Ranka and Aditi Sajwan. The series ended on 4 July 2022.

Synopsis
The series traces the childhood of Krishna and his strong bond with his foster-mother, Yashoda. Krishna's adventures, fondness for butter (maakhan), his love for both of his mothers, Devaki and Yashoda form the crux of the story. It also features his power and strength of standing against the wrong and protecting his family and village people against the evil Kans.

Cast

Main
 Hazel Gaur as Krishna: Lord Vishnu's 8th avatar; Vasudev and Devaki's eighth son; Yashoda and Nand's foster son; Balram's foster brother; Kans' nephew, Radha's Lover (2021–2022) 
 Aditi Sajwan as Yashoda: Nand's wife; Krishna's foster mother. (2021–2022)
 Sumedh Mudgalkar as Lord Vishnu: Lakshmi's husband; Mahadev's devotee;  Parvati's brother. (2021–2022)
 Mallika Singh as Devi Lakshmi: Lord Vishnu's wife. (2021–2022)
 Basant Bhatt as Sheshnag: Lord Vishnu's devotee; the serpent king. (2021–2022)
 Kevin Charadva as Balram: Sheshnaag's avataar; Vasudev and Devaki's seventh son; Rohini's foster son; Krishna's brother; Kans' nephew. (2021–2022)
 Kiara Singh as Radha: Vrishban and Kritida's daughter , Krishna's Spiritual Lover (2022–2022)
 Falaq Naaz as Devaki: Kans' sister; Vasudev's second wife; Balram and Krishna's mother. (2021–2022)
 Arpit Ranka as Kans: A demon king; Devaki's brother; Balram and Krishna's maternal uncle. (2021–2022)

Recurring
 Gavie Chahal as Nand: Gokul's head; Yashoda's husband; Krishna's foster father; Vasudev and Vrishbhan's friend. (2021-2022)
 ActorsFirdaush as senapati of kans (2022)
 Chetna Kaintura as Rohini: Vasudev's first wife; Balram's surrogate and foster mother. (2021–2022)
 Naveen Jinger as Vasudev: Rohini  and Devaki's husband; Nand's friend; Balram and Krishna's father. (2021–2022)
 Tarun Khanna in dual role as 
Lord Mahadev: Parvati's husband; Vishnu's devotee.(2021–2022)
Hanuman: Mahadev's incarnation (2021)
 Piyali Munshi in dual role as 
Devi Parvati: Mahadev's wife; Vishnu's sister. (2021–2022)
Yogmaya: Parvati's incarnation (2021)
 Shalini Vishnudev as Devi Saraswati: Brahma's wife; Brahma's daughter. (2021–2022)
 Manish Bishla as Indra: The rain god and King of heaven. (2021–2022)
 Kumar Hegde as Narada: Brahma's son; Vishnu's devotee. (2021–2022)
 Sonia Singh as Putana: Kans' demoness slayed by Krishna. (2021)
 Chandralekha Mukherjee as Asti: Kans's wife; Jarasandh's daughter. (2021-2022)
 Rakesh Kukreti as Vrishbhan: Radha's father; Kirtida's husband and chief of Barsana. (2022-2022)
 Akanksha Rawat as Kirtida: Radha's mother; Vrishbhan's wife (2022-2022)

References

Indian television series about Hindu deities
2021 Indian television series debuts
Hindi-language television shows
Star Bharat original programming
Krishna in popular culture
Swastik Productions television series